Moira, Ontario is an unincorporated area in the municipality of Centre Hastings, Hastings County, Ontario, Canada. Moira is also the name of a signpost on the Canadian National Railway main line which passes through Hastings County, although it is not a passenger stop.

Moira is not a valid locality name for mail delivery. Canada Post's web site indicates that mail for at least some Moira addresses is handled through Roslin, Ontario.

References

Atlas of Canada

Communities in Hastings County